Fabra is a surname. Notable people with the surname include:

 Alberto Fabra (born 1964), Spanish politician
 Belén Fabra (born 1977), Spanish actress
 Ferdinand Fabra (1906–2007), German football manager
 Frank Fabra (born 1991), Colombian professional footballer
 Ignazio Fabra (1930–2008), Italian wrestler
 Pompeu Fabra (1868–1948), Spanish engineer and grammarian

See also 
 Fabras
 Fabra Observatory, observatory near Catalonia

Spanish-language surnames